BGS Groundhog Desktop is a software tool developed and made available by the British Geological Survey and used for geological data visualisation, interpretation and 3D geologic modelling. It is available in both free-to-use and commercial editions. Groundhog Desktop is a key part of the BGS's work to develop 3D models of the UK subsurface.

It is widely used by other Geological Survey Organisations including at the Geological Survey of Sweden, Geological Survey of Finland and with environmental consultancies.

Features 
 Digitise and interpret geologic cross section
 Correlate borehole logs 
 Display and edit borehole data
 Import AGS borehole data
 Display and edit geologic map linework
 Import georeferenced imagery
 Import digital elevation model
 Develop conceptual site models (CSM)
 Develop 3D geological models

3D Geological Modelling 
BGS Groundhog Desktop uses an implicit modelling algorithm based on a diverse set of inputs. An interpolation algorithm processes the inputs and generates each geological layer according to geological rules in order to create a vertically consistent stack. The resulting model is visualised as a block model.

Example projects  
 A geological model of London and the Thames Valley, southeast England
 Modelling rapid coastal catch-up after defence removal along the soft cliff coast of Happisburgh, UK
 Enkoping Esker Pilot Study : workflow for data integration and publishing of 3D geological outputs
 UK Minecraft Geology Model built using Groundhog
 3D Geological Model of the completed Farringdon underground railway

References 

3D graphics software
British Geological Survey
Geology software
Geomorphology models
Scientific visualization